New Biggin or Newbiggin was a railway station which
served the village of Newbiggin near Kirkby Thore in Newbiggin parish, Cumbria, England. Whilst the station is now disused, the line is still operational and the nearest open station is Appleby.

History

It was built by the Midland Railway and opened on 1 May 1876. The station was designed by the Midland Railway company architect John Holloway Sanders.

The station was closed on 4 May 1970 (when the local service over the line was withdrawn by British Rail) and the disused platforms subsequently demolished. The station building on the eastern side of the line still survives and is maintained as a private house.

Stationmasters

A. Werrett 1876 - 1878
S. Marshall 1878 - 1882
R. Cotterill 1882 - 1888
H. Gabb 1888 - 1903
William Brown from 1903 (formerly station master at Ribblehead)
E.C. Sones until 1914
William Henry Clement 1914 - 1933  (also station master at Culgaith)

References

Disused railway stations in Cumbria
Former Midland Railway stations
Railway stations in Great Britain opened in 1876
Railway stations in Great Britain closed in 1970
John Holloway Sanders railway stations
Beeching closures in England